The Corsican finch (Carduelis corsicana), also known as the Corsican citril finch or Mediterranean citril finch, is a bird in the true finch family, Fringillidae.

Formerly, both it and the Citril finch were placed in the genus Serinus, but they appear to be close relatives of the European goldfinch (Arnaiz-Villena et al., 1998).

Distribution
It is endemic to the Mediterranean islands of Corsica, Sardinia, Elba, Capraia and Gorgona.

Description
It has dark-streaked brown upperparts and brighter yellow underparts than the citril finch does.

Taxonomy
The first formal description of the Corsican finch was by the German zoologist Alexander Koenig in 1899 under the binomial name Citrinella corsicana. It was formerly regarded a subspecies of the citril finch, but it differs in morphology and vocalizations (Förschler & Kalko, 2007) as well as mtDNA sequence (Sangster, 2000, contra Pasquet & Thibault, 1997, Förschler et al. 2009) and they are now considered distinct species (Sangster et al., 2002, Förschler et al. 2009).

References

Arnaiz-Villena, A., Alvarez-Tejado, M., Ruiz-del-Valle, V., Garcia-de-la-Torre, C., Varela, P., Recio, M., Martinez-Laso, J. (1998). Phylogeny and rapid Northern and Southern Hemisphere speciation of goldfinches during the Miocene and Pliocene Epochs. Cellular and Molecular Life Sciences, 54(9), 1031–1041.
Arnaiz-Villena, A., Gómez-Prieto, P., & Ruiz-de-Valle, V. (2009). Phylogeography of finches and sparrows. Animal Genetics", New York, NY: USA: Nova Pub.

 Zamora J, Moscoso J, Ruiz-del-Valle V, Lowy E, Serrano-Vela JI, et al. (2006) Conjoint mitochondrial phylogenetic trees for canaries (Serinus spp.) and goldfinches (Carduelis spp.) show several specific polytomies. Ardeola 53: 1–17.

External links
Audio recordings from Xeno-canto

Corsican finch
Birds of Southern Europe
Fauna of Corsica
Fauna of Sardinia
Corsican finch